Corumbella is an extinct genus of terminal-Ediacaran cnidarians. It is the only genus in the monotypic family Corumbellidae, and is represented by a single species Corumbella werneri. It possessed a carapace made up of thick polygonal rings in which plates with pores and papillae  attest to the
advent of skeletogenesis in the latest Neoproterozoic metazoan. It was a sessile predator and somewhat resembles the later conulariids.

See also
 Cloudina
 Saarina
 Sinotubulites
 Somatohelix
List of Ediacaran genera

References

Prehistoric cnidarian genera
Staurozoa
Ediacaran life
Fossil taxa described in 1982